Stuart Davidson may refer to:

 Stuart Davidson, British policeman who wrote a blog under the pseudonym PC David Copperfield
 Stuart Davidson (cricketer) (born 1972), Zimbabwean-born former Scottish cricketer
 Stuart Davidson (footballer) (born 1979), Scottish footballer
 Stuart C. Davidson (1922–2001), American businessman